Hobart was a former railroad station in the village of Hobart, Delaware County, New York, United States. The station closed when the railroad discontinued service on the branch on March 31, 1954.

Bibliography

References

External links
Ulster and Delaware Railroad Historical Society map

Railway stations in the Catskill Mountains
Former Ulster and Delaware Railroad stations
Railway stations in Delaware County, New York
Former railway stations in New York (state)
Railway stations closed in 1954
Railway stations in the United States opened in 1884
1884 establishments in New York (state)